Ayatollah Morteza Sadoughi Mazandarani  (Persian:  مرتضی صدوقی مازندرانی) (born 22 July 1946) is an Iranian Twelver Shi'a cleric.

He has studied in seminaries of Qum, Iran under Grand Ayatollah Mohammad Ali Araki and Mohammad-Reza Golpaygani and in seminaries of Mashhad, Iran under Grand Ayatollah Hossein Vahid Khorasani.

See also
 List of Ayatollahs

Notes

External links
Biography in Persian

Iranian ayatollahs
Iranian Islamists
Shia Islamists
1946 births
Living people